Bari Wood (born December 31, 1936) is an American author of science fiction, crime and horror novels.

Life and work
Wood was born in 1936 in Jacksonville, Illinois, the daughter of Israel S. Prosterman and Gertrude Ritman. She grew up in and around Chicago, and graduated from Northwestern University in Evanston, Illinois with a degree in English. She moved to New York in 1957, where she first worked in the library of the American Cancer Society, later as editor of the society's publication, CA: A Cancer Journal for Clinicians and of the medical journal Drug Therapy. In the early 1970s she began writing fiction.

In New York she fell in love with and married Dr. Gilbert Congdon Wood (b. 1915 – d. 2000), a biologist for the American Cancer Society. In 1981 they moved to a farmhouse in Ridgefield, Connecticut. In 2008, she married Dennis Preston Kazee and moved to Lansing, Michigan.

Wood wrote her first novel, The Killing Gift,  in 1975. It won the Putnam Prize for high-quality novels. It was followed by Twins, co-written with Jack Geasland in 1977. In 1988 the novel was adapted into a film under the title Dead Ringers with Jeremy Irons in the eponymous lead roles. Her 1993 novel Doll's Eyes was adapted into a film titled In Dreams in 1999.

Fiction

Films and television

References

External links
Fantastic Fiction

Notable Ridgefielders
Illinois Center For The Book

Living people
20th-century American novelists
American horror writers
American science fiction writers
American women novelists
Women science fiction and fantasy writers
Northwestern University alumni
People from Jacksonville, Illinois
Novelists from Illinois
1936 births
Women horror writers
20th-century American women writers
21st-century American women